The Blaenavon Railroad was a horse drawn tramroad built to link Blaenavon Ironworks with the Monmouthshire Canal in south east Wales.

Background

In 1789 most of the building of Blaenavon Ironworks had been completed and the lease for the land was signed in November. At this time transport of goods between Blaenavon and Newport was by teams of packhorses and mules using hillside tracks and parish roads.

A more efficient method of transport was needed and Thomas Hill I, the leading partner behind the ironworks, became one of the promoters of the Monmouthshire Canal. In 1791 a parliamentary bill proposed the canal and was given assent in 1792. The Canal Act also allowed for the building of tramroads to nearby collieries, quarries, and mines.

Construction

The newly formed Monmouthshire Canal Company appointed Thomas Dadford, Jr. as engineer for both the canal and tramroad. Construction started in 1793 and the tramroad/canal link to the port of Newport opened in February 1796.

The tramroad was originally built with a  gauge.

Closure

In 1845 the Monmouthshire Canal Company obtained an Act of Parliament to improve the Blaenavon Railroad and connect it to a new railway to Newport under the control of a new company, the Newport and Pontypool Railway. The completed  gauge line opened in 1854, replacing the tramroad.

Remains

Very little evidence of the tramroad is visible but an iron milepost exists on the road that was once the route of the tramroad.

References

Rail transport in Monmouthshire
Horse-drawn railways